The 1994 Calder Cup playoffs of the American Hockey League began on April 13, 1994. The twelve teams that qualified, four from each division, played best-of-seven series for division semifinals and division finals. The highest remaining seed received a bye for the third round while the other two remaining teams played a best-of-3 series, with the winner advancing to play the bye-team in a best-of-seven series for the Calder Cup. The Calder Cup Final ended on May 29, 1994, with the Portland Pirates defeating the Moncton Hawks four games to two to win the first Calder Cup in team history. Portland's Olaf Kolzig won the Jack A. Butterfield Trophy as AHL playoff MVP.

Portland's Mike Boback tied an AHL playoff record for points in a single playoff game by scoring 7 points (3 goals, 4 assists) in game 5 of the Northern division semifinal against the Albany River Rats.

Playoff seeds
After the 1993-94 AHL regular season, 12 teams qualified for the playoffs. The top four teams from each division qualified for the playoffs. The St. John's Maple Leafs finished the regular season with the best overall record.

Atlantic Division
St. John's Maple Leafs - 102 points
Saint John Flames - 84 points
Moncton Hawks - 81 points
Cape Breton Oilers - 77 points

Northern Division
Adirondack Red Wings - 98 points
Portland Pirates - 96 points
Albany River Rats - 84 points
Springfield Indians - 71 points

Southern Division
Hershey Bears - 87 points
Hamilton Canucks - 79 points
Cornwall Aces - 77 points
Rochester Americans - 77 points

Bracket

In each round the team that earned more points during the regular season receives home ice advantage, meaning they receive the "extra" game on home-ice if the series reaches the maximum number of games. For the Semifinal round, the team that earned the most points during the regular season out of the three remaining teams receives a bye directly to the Calder Cup Final. There is no set series format due to arena scheduling conflicts and travel considerations.

Division Semifinals 
Note 1: Home team is listed first.
Note 2: The number of overtime periods played (where applicable) is not specified

Atlantic Division

(A1) St. John's Maple Leafs vs. (A4) Cape Breton Oilers

(A2) Saint John Flames vs. (A3) Moncton Hawks

Northern Division

(N1) Adirondack Red Wings vs. (N4) Springfield Indians 

The deciding game was the last for the sixty-year-old Springfield Indians franchise, which moved to Worcester, Massachusetts, in the offseason to become the Worcester IceCats.

(N2) Portland Pirates vs. (N3) Albany River Rats

Southern Division

(S1) Hershey Bears vs. (S4) Rochester Americans

(S2) Hamilton Canucks vs. (S3) Cornwall Aces

Division Finals

Atlantic Division

(A1) St. John's Maple Leafs vs. (A3) Moncton Hawks

Northern Division

(N1) Adirondack Red Wings vs. (N2) Portland Pirates

Southern Division

(S1) Hershey Bears vs. (S3) Cornwall Aces

Semifinal

Bye
(N2) Portland Pirates receive a bye to the Calder Cup Final by virtue of having earned the highest point total in the regular season out of the three remaining teams.

(A3) Moncton Hawks vs. (S3) Cornwall Aces

Calder Cup Final

(N2) Portland Pirates vs. (A3) Moncton Hawks

See also
1993–94 AHL season
List of AHL seasons

References

Calder Cup
Calder Cup playoffs